The Many Faces of Oliver Hart is a studio album by Eyedea, released under the pseudonym Oliver Hart. It was released on Rhymesayers Entertainment in 2002. In 2014, a vinyl edition of the album was released as a Record Store Day exclusive. The Village Voice included it on the "10 Must-Have Record Store Day Releases" list.

In 2011, Complex placed "Bottle Dreams" at number 11 on the "25 Best Rhymesayers Songs" list. In 2015, City Pages placed "Forget Me" at number 4 on the "Slug's 10 Best Deep Cuts" list.

Track listing

References

External links
 

2002 debut albums
Rhymesayers Entertainment albums